Sir George Ebenezer Wilson Couper, 2nd Baronet,  (29 April 1824 – 5 March 1908) was a British civil servant in India.

Biography
Couper was the eldest son of Colonel Sir George Couper, Chief Equerry and Comptroller of the Household of Princess Victoria, Duchess of Kent. His father was created a baronet in 1841.

He was educated at the Royal Military Academy Sandhurst. He was sent to India in 1846 and joined the Bengal Civil Service. He was appointed a Companion of the Order of the Bath in the 1860 Birthday Honours while serving as Secretary to the Chief Commissioner of Oude, James Outram.

From 26 July 1876 to 15 February 1877, he was Lieutenant-Governor of the North-Western Provinces. In 1877, he was created a Knight Commander of the Order of the Star of India  and in 1878 a Companion of the Order of the Indian Empire.

From 15 February 1877 to 17 April 1882, he was Lieutenant Governor of the North-Western Provinces and Chief Commissioner of Oudh.

Family
In 1852, he married Caroline Penelope Every, sister of Sir Henry Every, 10th Baronet. He had three sons, who were all in the military, and a daughter. Sir George died in Camberley, aged 84. His eldest son, Ramsay George Henry Couper, succeeded him in the baronetcy.

References

Graduates of the Royal Military College, Sandhurst
Indian Civil Service (British India) officers
Lieutenant-Governors of the North-Western Provinces
Baronets in the Baronetage of the United Kingdom
1824 births
1908 deaths
Knights Commander of the Order of the Star of India
Companions of the Order of the Bath
Companions of the Order of the Indian Empire
British people of the Indian Rebellion of 1857